Suzanne Hall (born 1972), is an Australian born British actress.

Before attending her first secondary school, Worden Sports College in Leyland, she went to Hayward School in Bolton and, at that time lived in Great Lever, but now lives in Smithills. She is an actress who played Suzanne Ashworth in Channel 4 soap opera Hollyoaks, from 2005 to 2010 and again in 2011 and 2012. She was previously best known as Curly Watts' sometime love interest Kimberley Taylor in Coronation Street. Her on-screen father was played by actor John Jardine who now plays her father-in-law in Hollyoaks. She also had a minor role as a GP in series 4 of the Manchester Drama Cold Feet. In 1987 she appeared in a children's television program called Jossy's Giants about a fictional youth football team, playing Opal, girlfriend of goalkeeper Harvey. As well as being an actress, Suzanne is a qualified teacher, who teaches media studies at Our Lady and St John's Catholic Arts College in Blackburn, Lancashire.

References

External links
 

English television actresses
Living people
English soap opera actresses
People from Great Lever
1972 births